Bara is a rural commune and village in the Cercle of Ansongo in the Gao Region of south-eastern Mali.

References

External links
.

Communes of Gao Region